Checkmarx is a software security company headquartered in Atlanta, Georgia in the United States. The company was acquired in April 2020 by Hellman & Friedman, a private equity firm with headquarters in San Francisco. Founded in 2006, Checkmarx integrates automated software security technologies into DevOps. Checkmarx provides static and interactive application security testing (SAST and IAST), Software Composition Analysis (SCA), infrastructure as code security testing (KICS), and application security and training development (Codebashing). 

Checkmarx's research department is known for uncovering technical vulnerabilities in popular technologies, software, applications, and IoT devices.

History 
Checkmarx was founded in Israel by Maty Siman, the company's CTO, and has over 900 employees. Emmanuel Benzaquen has served as the CEO since 2006. 

In 2017, Checkmarx acquired Codebashing, an application security training company. In 2018, Checkmarx acquired Custodela, a company that provides software security program development as well as consulting services.

In November 2019, the company's security research team uncovered a number of vulnerabilities affecting Google and Samsung smartphones. The vulnerabilities allowed an attacker to take remote control of smartphone apps, giving them the ability to take photos, record video and conversations, and identify the phone’s location. The research team submitted a report to the Android security team at Google and continued to provide feedback as the vulnerabilities were addressed.

In January 2020, Checkmarx detailed multiple security vulnerabilities with the Trifo Ironpie robot vacuum. The company has also uncovered issues with Amazon Alexa, Meetup, and Tinder, among others.

In August 2021, Checkmarx acquired Dustico, a software that detects backdoors and malicious attacks in software supply chain.

Funding 
Checkmarx's early investors include Salesforce, which remains a partner as Checkmarx provides security reviews for the Salesforce AppExchange. In 2015, U.S. private equity and venture capital firm Insight Partners acquired Checkmarx for $84 million.

In April 2020, private equity firm Hellman & Friedman, alongside private investment firm TPG, acquired Checkmarx for $1.15 billion. After the acquisition, Insight Partners retained a minority interest in the company.

See also 
 Security testing

References 

Software companies established in 2006
Software companies of Israel
Computer security software
Computer security software companies
Static program analysis tools
Software testing tools